Time Stalkers, also known as  in Japan, is a Dreamcast role-playing video game featuring appearances of worlds (and playable characters) from several of Climax Entertainment's earlier games in crossover fashion. The player initially takes the role of Sword, a character caught in a world made of many worlds. As he goes along, similar heroes show up for the player to control. The player may do things such as enter dungeons, take special assignments, and upgrade/buy/sell items.

Gameplay
Time Stalkers is a role-playing video game with party members consisting of Climax characters as well as in-game enemies that can be collected and trained. The battle system combines RTS and turned based out of phase situational combat. The enemies appear on screen and transition to individual arrangements for RTS style combat. The game takes between 30–60 hours to complete and features multiple endings.

Plot

Reception

Time Stalkers received mixed reviews according to the review aggregation website GameRankings. Pete Bartholow of GameSpot gave the Japanese import a mixed review, criticizing its "traditional" story, randomized dungeon layouts, ugly graphics, and most particularly the resetting of experience points at the beginning of each dungeon. He concluded by advising gamers to instead get the "vastly superior" Evolution: The World of Sacred Device (the Dreamcast's only other RPG at that time). Anoop Gantayat of IGN praised the unique overworld and the monster capture mechanic. However, like GameSpot, he took issue with the resetting of experience points, and also complained of the game's concise dialogue and short length. PlanetDreamcast gave it a negative review, over a month and a half before its U.S. release date. Jeff Lundrigan of NextGen said of the game, "It ain't bad, but the Dreamcast RPG audience needs more than this generic fix." In Japan, Famitsu gave it a score of 27 out of 40. GamePro summed up the review of the game by saying, "RPG aficionados looking for that great adventure for the Dreamcast will have to wait – Time Stalkers isn't it. While it'll probably satisfy dungeon crawlers, it will barely get a real adventurer's attention."

Notes

References

External links
 

1999 video games
Crossover role-playing video games
Dreamcast games
Dreamcast-only games
Sega video games
Video games developed in Japan
Single-player video games